Plasma Physics and Controlled Fusion is a monthly peer-reviewed scientific journal covering plasma physics. It is published by the Institute of Physics and the editor-in-chief is R.O. Dendy (Euratom/UKAEA Fusion Association). The journal was established in 1960 as Plasma Physics, obtaining its current title in 1984.

Abstracting and indexing
The journal is abstracted and indexed in:

According to the Journal Citation Reports, the journal has a 2020 impact factor of 2.458.

References

External links

Plasma science journals
Monthly journals
English-language journals
Publications established in 1960
IOP Publishing academic journals